Skutch is a surname. Notable people with the surname include:

 Alexander Skutch (1904–2004), American naturalist and writer 
Arlene Anderson Skutch (1924-2012), singer, actress and painter 
 Ira Skutch, American television producer: DuMont Television Network and other networks, Match Game and other shows
 Robert Skutch and Judith Skutch Whitson, American first copyrighters of A Course in Miracles

See also 
 Skutsch